The 2007–08 season is Beitar Jerusalem's 39th season in Israeli Premier League. 
2007-08 season was the successful season in all Beitar history with double (Championship and State Cup).

First team

Ligat Ha'Al (Premier League)

League table

State Cup

UEFA Champions League

Second qualifying round

External links
 Beitar Jerusalem website

Beitar Jerusalem F.C. seasons
Beitar Jerusalem
Beitar Jerusalem F.C.